Magne Simonsen (born 13 July 1988) is a Norwegian football defender who currently plays for 2. divisjon club Byåsen.

Career
He hails from Slemmestad, but joined Lyn at a young age. He made his debut in the 2006 Royal League, then played a Norwegian football cup game before making his Norwegian top flight debut on 6 August 2006 against Molde FK. He even scored a goal. Ahead of the 2007 season he was loaned to Asker. He returned before the end of the season, and played 7 league games. He made his breakthrough in the 2008 season. He joined Molde ahead of the 2010 season.

Ahead of the 2018 season he was named as Byåsen's new playing assistant coach.

Career statistics

References

1988 births
Living people
People from Røyken
Norwegian footballers
Lyn Fotball players
Asker Fotball players
Molde FK players
Fredrikstad FK players
Eliteserien players
Norwegian First Division players
Association football fullbacks
Sportspeople from Viken (county)